Evansville Regional Airport  is three miles north of Evansville, in Vanderburgh County, Indiana, United States. It is owned and operated by the Evansville-Vanderburgh Airport Authority District.

Federal Aviation Administration records say the airport say EVV’s annual traffic grew by nearly seven percent in 2018, in comparison to passenger counts the previous year. EVV reports that through Dec. 2018, year-to-date enplanements, or passengers departing from EVV, totaled 235,082, surpassing the prior year’s traffic that totaled 220,046 passengers. EVV’s total number of travelers, which includes the passengers who flew in to EVV from other airports, also grew last year, to nearly a half million people annually. EVV’s passenger traffic has grown by 35 percent in only four short years.
It is the fourth largest airport in the State of Indiana after Fort Wayne International Airport, South Bend International Airport, and Indianapolis International Airport.

The National Plan of Integrated Airport Systems for 2017-2021 calls it a non-hub primary service airport (more than 10,000 enplanements per year).

It has daily flights to and from airline hubs: Atlanta, Charlotte, and Dallas/Fort Worth.

As of March 2022, American Eagle and Delta Connection have temporarily suspended services to Chicago, Illinois and Detroit, Michigan respectively.

History
Built in 1928 on 260 acres (1.1 km2) of land along U.S. Highway 41 and funded by a city bond issue, the original airport had a small terminal, weather bureau, hangar, runways, boundary lights, grading, and drainage.

On June 16, 1930, the Evansville Municipal Airport was dedicated. The runways, 100 X 1,200 feet and four inches thick, cost $30,000. The first airport manager was Werner J. Genot, who took charge on December 16, 1930.

Interstate Airlines stopped at Evansville on their Chicago-Atlanta and St. Louis-Louisville routes on October 19, 1928. Also in 1928, Capital Air Corporation started passenger flights through Evansville. The airport did not have an airline from February 1933 until 1940, when Eastern Airlines started two departures a day. Plans were made for expansion.

In 1950 a new terminal opened at a cost of $787,000. The Evansville city council passed an ordinance to change the name of the airport to Dress Memorial Airport on October 11, 1950, and on October 29, 1950, the new terminal was dedicated. The airport property now covered 467 acres; 347 acres was used for aircraft operations and 120 acres was used for agriculture.

The first jet at the Evansville airport landed in September 1964, a chartered 727 carrying presidential candidate Barry Goldwater.
 
The original terminal was replaced in 1988 with the new William H. Dress Terminal, designed by Hafer Associates with 140,000 square feet (13,000 m2) and ten gates.

In January 2012, the airport announced the adding of four new jet bridges. At the beginning of 2013, the jet bridges were installed. This allowed passengers to avoid having to exit the terminal and board the plane from the outside. It was the first time that Evansville Regional Airport had new jet bridges, since US Air exited the Evansville market in the 1990s. A subsequent ribbon cutting took place at the airport on 17 January 2013.

In the 2010s, the airport began to see passenger growth. In response to this, on August 20, 2014, Delta Air Lines upgraded to a Boeing 717 with daily service to Atlanta. Delta further upgraded to a McDonnell Douglas MD-88 at the beginning of summer in 2015, in addition with current 717 service, occasionally replacing the smaller aircraft on some flights.  Currently Delta runs the 717 service for its first flight out of Evansville and its late flight into Evansville. Delta has recently stopped their 717 service in Evansville due to aging aircraft, but has replaced that aircraft with the  Bombardier CRJ-900 for its Atlanta service.  Also, on October 2, 2014, American Eagle began daily service to Charlotte using a Bombardier CRJ-200. On June 4, 2015, United Express began three daily flights to O'Hare International Airport in Chicago utilizing the Embraer ERJ-145. Currently American Eagle uses a Bombardier CRJ-900 for its Dallas-Fort Worth service.

After further growth and expansion at the airport, the Vanderburgh Airport Authority approved the construction of a fifth jet bridge in Concourse A. Furthermore, on June 2, 2016, Allegiant Air began flights to Orlando/Sanford, operating two weekly flights on Sunday and Thursday utilizing the McDonnell Douglas MD-80. The flights are now operated on Airbus A320 aircraft.

On November 8, 2021, Evansville Regional announced that United Airlines was pulling their daily flights to Chicago.  Evansville was one of 15 other airports that United pulled service from.

On March 3, 2022, Evansville Regional announced American Airlines has paused their daily Chicago flights. With this pause, Evansville has no direct flights to Chicago.   Days later it was also released that Delta has suspended their Detroit service from Evansville for an undertermined amount of time.

Facilities
Evansville Regional Airport covers 1,250 acres (506 ha) at an elevation of 422 feet (127 m). It has three asphalt runways: 4/22 is 8,021 by 150 feet (2,445 x 46 m); 18/36 is 6,286 by 150 feet (1,916 x 46 m); 9/27 is 3,497 by 75 feet (1,066 x 23 m).

The airport has an instrument landing system.

In the year ending June 30, 2021, the airport had 34,693 aircraft operations, averaging 95 per day: 60% general aviation, 28% air taxi, 8% military, and 4% airline. 36 aircraft were then based at the airport: 36 single-engine, 7 multi-engine, 4 jet, and 1 helicopter

In 2020 the airport completed a covered parking area covered with solar panels, the largest such installation in the midwest.

Terminal
The terminal boasts a number of amenities and services for passengers and visitors. The WiFi lounge has 24/7 internet access and chairs and tables. The Meals & More restaurant serves breakfast, lunch, daily specials, and has a gift shop. The cocktail lounge has brand-name beers, wines, spirits, and local favorites for passengers' 21 and over enjoyment, with flat screen TVs and sitting areas. An assortment of different games and a play room for children are offered in the front of the terminal. Visitors can browse a collection of airplane models with brief facts on each of the planes. The concourse has an observation area. There are meeting rooms free of charge to conduct business meetings while still in the terminal. Valets are available outside to assist with luggage and parking. Hotel shuttles to different lodging accommodations in the Evansville area can be requested in the front of the terminal.

The terminal has two concourses set for Allegiant, American, Delta, and United, respectively. Concourse A has three jet bridges and one hardstand gate, while Concourse B has two jet bridges and six hardstand gates, and each has vending machines, restrooms and drinking fountains.

Delta and United operate out of Concourse A, gates A1-A4. Allegiant and American operate out of Concourse B, gates B1-B6.

Airlines and destinations

Passenger

Cargo

Airport statistics

Former air service

Previous service included Century Airlines, Trans World Express, Eastern Air Lines, Air Illinois, US Air, Piedmont Airlines, Chicago Express Airlines, Atlantic Southeast Airlines, Northwest Airlink, Comair, Britt Airways, Cape Air, Interstate Airlines, Capital Air Corporation, and United (operating as United Express)

Accidents and incidents
 On April 21, 1943, a USAF Lockheed Lodestar stalled and crashed at EVV during a go-around, all 10 occupants were killed.
 On March 20, 1968, a Delta Air Lines Convair CV-340 made a single-engine landing at Evansville in rain and low ceiling conditions and crash-landed after aborting a go-around. All three crew and 39 passengers survived, but the plane was damaged beyond repair and written off.
 On December 13, 1977, Douglas C-53 N51071 of National Jet Services, operating as Air Indiana Flight 216, crashed on take-off from Evansville on a non-scheduled passenger flight to Nashville Metropolitan Airport, Tennessee. All 29 people on board were killed, including the entire University of Evansville basketball team. The cause of the accident was that the gust locks had not been removed and the aircraft was improperly loaded, resulting in an aft center of gravity.
 On February 6, 1992, a C-130 military transport aircraft operated by the Kentucky Air National Guard, with five crew aboard, crashed at 9:48 A.M. one mile south of the airport in the parking lot of JoJo's restaurant in connection with the Drury Inn on U.S. Highway 41 intersecting Lynch Road. 17 people were killed in the crash and 15 others were injured. Both JoJo's restaurant and Drury Inn just south of the airport were damaged but were repaired and continued operating, although the former JoJo's building now houses a Denny's restaurant, and the former Drury Inn is now a Comfort Inn & Suites.

See also

 Indiana World War II Army Airfields
 List of airports in Indiana

References

External links
 Evansville Regional Airport (official site)
 Aerial photo from Indiana Department of Transportation
 Aerial image as of March 1998 from USGS The National Map
 
 

Airfields of the United States Army Air Forces Technical Service Command
Buildings and structures in Evansville, Indiana
Airports in Indiana
Airfields of the United States Army Air Forces in Indiana
Transportation buildings and structures in Vanderburgh County, Indiana
Transportation in Evansville, Indiana
1930 establishments in Indiana
Airports established in 1930